Elva Ambía is a Peruvian award-winning educator, Quechua language activist, writer, and founder of the Quechua Collective of New York.

Early life 
A Quechua native speaker, Elva Ambía was born in the Andean region of Huancavelica and grew up in Chincheros, Apurímac; then migrated to Lima, the country's capital. Due to the country's economic situation and to help her family in Peru, she migrated to the United States at the age of 22. In New York City she worked at sewing factories, social service offices and schools.

Quechua language activism 
Ambía said that her activism started when she tried to find Quechua books at her local public library, and realized she couldn't find anyone. Then, she felt the need to promote this language and culture of the Andes. In 2012 she co-founded the Quechua Collective of New York. The organization's mission aims to preserve and diffuse Quechua languages through workshops, cultural events, and educational programming in New York City 

The documentary Living Quechua (2015) features Elva Ambía's work on promoting Quechua and Indigenous Languages in the United States. In 2018 Ambía received the Quechua Award for Lifetime Achievement by The Quechua Alliance

Literary works 
In 2017 she published Qoricha, a trilingual children's book  in Quechua, Spanish and English.

References 

Living people
Quechua-language writers
Peruvian emigrants to the United States
1941 births
American children's writers
American women children's writers
21st-century American writers
21st-century American women writers
Writers from New York City
People from Huancavelica Region
Quechua language activists
Activists from New York City